Küllo Arjakas (born 10 October 1959 in Pärnu) is an Estonian historian and politician. He has been a member of the IX and X Riigikogu.

He is a member of the Estonian Centre Party.

Publications
 "Eesti ajalugu ärkamisajast kuni tänapäevani". Koolibri 1992
 "Rahvarinne". Koos Vilja Laanaruga. Tallinn: Eesti Keskerakond, 1998.
 "Eesti Vabariik 90: sündmused ja arengud". Eesti Entsüklopeediakirjastus 2008
 "Faatum: Eesti tee hävingule 1939-1940: riigikontrolör Karl Soonpää päevik Eesti Vabariigi saatuseaastatest 1939-1940: Molotovi–Ribbentropi pakti tagamaad: dokumente ja materjale", 2009, 
 "Eesti raudtee 140. Sissevaated ajalukku". Tallinn: Eesti Raudtee, 2010
 "Loto, loto: Eesti Loto 40". Tallinn 2011
 "Eesti hümn". Tallinn: Menu kirjastus, 2012
 "Eesti lipp". Tallinn: Menu kirjastus, 2013
 "Kui väikesed olid suured: Balti kett 25 ". Tallinn: Rahvarinde Muuseum, 2014
 "Saku Õlletehas 195: Eesti õllekultuuri edendamine 1820-2015". Tallinn: Menu kirjastus: Saku Õlletehas, 2015

References

1959 births
Living people
20th-century Estonian historians
Estonian Centre Party politicians
Members of the Riigikogu, 1999–2003
Members of the Riigikogu, 2003–2007
Recipients of the Order of the National Coat of Arms, 4th Class
University of Tartu alumni
People from Pärnu
21st-century Estonian historians